Than Sein is a Burmese politician and former military officer. He currently serves as a Pyithu Hluttaw member.

Than Sein was born on 1 February 1946 in Pegu, Burma. He is married to Rosy Than Sein. He is a former Brigadier-General in the Myanmar Army, serving as a Commandant of the Mingaladon Defence Services Hospital.

Than Sein contested the 2010 Burmese general election as a Union Solidarity and Development Party candidate for the Pyithu Hluttaw, representing the Kyimyindaing Township constituency. He won the election with 19,225 votes, about 42% of the votes.

References

1946 births
Burmese military personnel
Burmese politicians
Living people
People from Bago Region
Union Solidarity and Development Party politicians